Paopi 5 - Coptic Calendar - Paopi 7

The sixth day of the Coptic month of Paopi, the second month of the Coptic year. On a common year, this day corresponds to October 3, of the Julian Calendar, and October 16, of the Gregorian Calendar. This day falls in the Coptic season of Akhet, the season of inundation.

Commemorations

Saints 

 The departure of the Righteous Hannah the Prophetess, the Mother of Samuel the Prophet

References 

Days of the Coptic calendar